Arvo Albin Turtiainen (16 September 1904, Helsinki – 8 October 1980) was a Finnish writer and recipient of the Eino Leino Prize in 1973.

Works
 Muutos (1936)
 Rautakourat (1938)
 Tie pilven alta (1939)
 Palasin kotiin (1944)
 Laulu kiven ja raudan ympyrässä (1945)
 Ihminen n:o 503/42 (1946)
 Laulu puolueelle (1946)
 Tapahtui satamassa (1954)
 Laulu ajasta ja rakkaudesta (1954)
 Minä rakastan (1955)
 Syyskevät (1959)
 Minä paljasjalkainen (1962)
 Runoja 1943–64 (1964)
 Hyvää joulua (1967)
 Puheita Porthaninrinteellä (1968)
 Leivän kotimaa (1974)
 Runoja 1934–68 (1974)
 Minun maailmani: Kirjoituksia 1932–1975 (1978)

References

1904 births
1980 deaths
Writers from Helsinki
People from Uusimaa Province (Grand Duchy of Finland)
Finnish writers
Recipients of the Eino Leino Prize